Aaron Bugeja is a Maltese judge. He led the investigation into Joseph Muscat following the Panama Papers leaks.

See also 
 Judiciary of Malta

References

Living people
Year of birth missing (living people)
Place of birth missing (living people)
21st-century Maltese judges